Camkin is a surname. Notable people with the surname include:

Bill Camkin (1894–1956), English billiard hall owner, father of John
John Camkin (1922–1998), English journalist and sports administrator